The 34th Ohio Infantry Regiment was an infantry regiment that served in the Union Army during the American Civil War. It primarily served in the Eastern Theater in what is now West Virginia and in Virginia's Shenandoah Valley region.  They are well known for wearing early in the war an americanized zouave uniform which consisted of: A dark blue jacket with red trimming, a pair of sky blue baggy trousers with two stripes of red tape going down vertically, a pair of tan gaiters, and a red Ottoman styled fez with a blue tassel.  The uniform lasted at least until 1863 based on photographic evidence.

Organization and service

The 34th Ohio Infantry Regiment was raised at Camp Lucas near Cincinnati on September 1, 1861. Most of the recruits came from the western part of the state. After training and drilling, the new regiment moved to Camp Dennison on September 1, and then entrained for the front lines, arriving on September 20 at Camp Enyart on the Kanawha River in western Virginia. It initially served in the forces under George B. McClellan, and then under a variety of generals for the next two years while engaging in several raids and operations in the region. On September 25, 1861, the 34th Ohio won a victory at the Battle of Kanawha Gap near present-day Chapmanville, West Virginia. In September 1862, the regiment fought in the Kanawha Valley Campaign of 1862, doing much of the fighting at the Battle of Fayetteville near the New and Kanawha rivers.

The regiment was mounted during May 1863. Colonel John Toland was killed July 18, 1863, in the Wytheville Raid. When the regiment's term of enlistment expired late in 1863, the men voted to re-enlist on December 23. They were part of Crook's Expedition against the Virginia & Tennessee Railroad in early May and fought in the Battle of Cloyd's Mountain on May 9 and later in the Battle of Cove Mountain and in other smaller engagements in the region. The regiment was re-mustered as a veteran regiment on January 19, 1864, and participated in many of the battles of the Valley Campaigns of 1864, including the Battle of Opequon near Winchester, Virginia.

The 34th Ohio suffered 10 Officers and 120 enlisted men killed in battle or died from wounds, and 130 enlisted men dead from disease for a total of 260 fatalities. The much depleted regiment was amalgamated with the 36th Ohio Infantry on February 22, 1865.

See also
List of Ohio Civil War units

Notes

References
The Civil War Archive

External links
Larry Stevens' 34th Ohio Infantry Page

Units and formations of the Union Army from Ohio
1862 establishments in Ohio
Military units and formations established in 1862
Military units and formations disestablished in 1865